Bronte may refer to:

People
Surname
 Brontë family, an English literary family that included:
 Anne Brontë (1820-1849), novelist and poet
 Branwell Brontë (1817-1848), painter and poet
 Charlotte Brontë (1816-1855), novelist and poet
 Elizabeth Brontë (1815-1825)
 Emily Brontë (1818-1848), novelist and poet
 Maria Brontë (1814-1825)
 Patrick Brontë (1777-1861), curate and writer

First name
 Bronte Barratt (b. 1989), Australian swimmer
 Bronte Campbell (b. 1994), Australian swimmer
 Bronte Dooley (1867-1913), Australian politician
 Bronte Law (b. 1995), English golfer

Title
 The Dukes of Bronte:
 1st Duke of Bronte, naval commander, better known as Horatio Nelson, 1st Viscount Nelson
 2nd Duke of Bronte, clergyman, better known as William Nelson, 1st Earl Nelson
 3rd Duchess of Bronte, better known as Charlotte Hood, Baroness Bridport
 4th Duke of Bronte, general, better known as Alexander Hood, 1st Viscount Bridport
 5th Duke of Bronte, courtier, better known as Sir Alexander Hood
 6th Duke of Bronte, naval commander and politician, better known as Rowland Hood, 3rd Viscount Bridport
 7th Duke of Bronte, investment banker, better known as Alexander Hood, 4th Viscount Bridport

Places
Australia
 Bronte, New South Wales, a suburb in the Municipality of Waverley
 Bronte Park, Tasmania, a locality in Central Highlands local government area

Canada
 Bronte, Ontario, a locality in the Regional Municipality of Halton
 Bronte Creek, a waterway in the Regional Municipality of Halton and City of Hamilton, Ontario
 Bronte Creek Provincial Park, a park in the Regional Municipality of Halton, Ontario
 Bronte GO Station, a transit station in the Regional Municipality of Halton, Ontario

England
 Brontë Country, an area mainly in the Metropolitan County of West Yorkshire
 Brontë Parsonage Museum, a museum in the Metropolitan County of West Yorkshire
 Brontë Waterfall, a waterfall in the Metropolitan County of West Yorkshire

Italy
 Bronte, Sicily, a comune in the Metropolitan City of Catania

New Zealand
Bronte, New Zealand, a locality in Nelson Province, New Zealand

United States
 Bronte, Texas, a town in Coke County

Other uses
 Brontë (play), a play by Polly Teale
 Brontë (lunar crater), a crater visited by Apollo 17 astronauts
 Brontë (Mercurian crater), a crater on Mercury
 Bronte (mythology), a goddess of thunder and the sister of Astrape

See also
 Brontes (disambiguation)

English-language unisex given names